Kris Kolluri (born c. 1969) served as head of the New Jersey Schools Development Authority, having taken office as of December 1, 2008, where he succeeded Scott Weiner. He had previously served as Commissioner of the New Jersey Department of Transportation (NJDOT), having been sworn into office on March 13, 2006. He spent one day, December 28, 2006 as acting Governor.

Prior to that, Kolluri specialized in redevelopment and transportation law as an attorney at Parker McCay of Marlton.

Kolluri was Chief of Staff to New Jersey Transportation Commissioner Jack Lettiere. In this capacity, he served as counselor to the Commissioner and managed the development and implementation of the department's legislative and regulatory policies and communications strategies.
 
Before taking this post, Kolluri was Assistant Commissioner of Intergovernmental Relations under Commissioner Jamie Fox at the New Jersey Department of Transportation. Kolluri was in charge of legislative relations, customer advocacy and public outreach and the divisions of Policy, Legislation and Regulatory Actions, and Federal and International Transportation.

Prior to working in state government, Kolluri held a variety of top positions in Congressional offices. Most recently he served as Senior Policy Advisor to House Democratic Leader Richard A. Gephardt, heading the Member Support Program which was established to help freshman Members of Congress design and implement long-term strategic initiatives. In early 1998, Kolluri was tapped to be special advisor to Congressman Gephardt on India and Indian-American affairs.

Before he worked for Congressman Gephardt, Kolluri served as Congressman Robert E. Andrews' Legislative Director and his principal staffer on the International Relations Subcommittee on Asia and the Pacific.

Kolluri received a Bachelor of Science degree in Management and Marketing from Rutgers University, a Master's degree in International Business from Johns Hopkins University and a J.D. degree from Georgetown University. He lives in West Windsor Township with his wife and two daughters.

On December 28, 2006, Kolluri served as acting Governor, while New Jersey Governor Jon Corzine, the Senate president, Assembly speaker, and attorney general were all out of state. Under state law at the time, an acting governor had to be appointed whenever the governor is absent from the state.
Since a 2006 constitutional amendment, New Jersey has had a lieutenant governor, second in the line of succession. The position was first filled by Kim Guadagno, elected with Chris Christie in November 2009.

References

1969 births
American politicians of Indian descent
Asian-American people in New Jersey politics
Georgetown University Law Center alumni
Johns Hopkins University alumni
Living people
New Jersey Commissioners of Transportation
People from West Windsor, New Jersey
Rutgers University alumni
State cabinet secretaries of New Jersey